The Brooklyn Royal Giants were a professional Negro league baseball team based in Brooklyn, New York.  Formed in 1905 by John Wilson Connor (1875–1926), owner of the Brooklyn Royal Cafe, the team initially played against white semi-pro teams. They were one of the prominent independent teams prior to World War I before organized league play began.

League play 

In 1907, the Brooklyn Royal Giants joined the National Association of Colored Baseball Clubs of the United States and Cuba. The league lasted three seasons and included the teams Philadelphia Giants, Cuban X-Giants, Cuban Stars of Havana, and the Cuban Giants of New York.

During the 1920s, under the ownership of Nat Strong, a white New York City booking agent, the team fell into somewhat of a decline, and did very poorly while in the Eastern Colored League.  The Giants played their home games while part of the Eastern Colored League at Dexter Park in Queens.

Final years and demise 

The Giants played a pair of games against teams featuring Babe Ruth and Lou Gehrig. On October 11, 1926, the Giants took on a squad featuring Babe Ruth in Bradley Beach, New Jersey. The Giants won this game 3-1. Following this, in 1928, the Giants played a combined team of the Bustin' Babes (Ruth's barnstorming squad) and the Larrupin' Lous (Gehrig's barnstorming squad) in Asbury Park, New Jersey. The Giants returned to independent play in 1928 and rebuilt the roster, but the quality of the rebuilt team never matched that of the early years. By the mid-1930s, the quality was no better than that of a minor league team, and in the early 1940s it had fallen to a semi-professional status. The team disbanded in 1942.

Significant players 
Smokey Joe Williams
"Cannonball" Dick Redding
Frank Wickware
Charles "Chino" Smith
John Henry "Pop" Lloyd

Notes and references

General

Inline citations

External links
 1920 Brooklyn Royal Giants Calendar

African-American history in New York City
Negro league baseball teams
Defunct baseball teams in New York City
Sports in Brooklyn
Baseball teams disestablished in 1942
Baseball teams established in 1905